The 2004 IAAF World Cross Country Championships took place on March 20/21, 2004.  The races were held at the Ossegem Park in Brussels, the capital of Belgium.  Reports of the event were given in The New York Times, and for the IAAF.

The new team scores introduced in 2002 were reverted to the original form as used in 2001 and earlier.

Complete results for senior men, for senior men's teams, for men's short race, for men's short race teams, for junior men, for junior men's teams, senior women, for senior women's teams, for women's short race, for women's short race teams, for junior women,  for junior women's teams, medallists, and the results of British athletes who took part were published.

Medallists

Race results

Senior men's race (12 km)

Note: Athletes in parentheses did not score for the team result

Men's short race (4 km)

Note: Athletes in parentheses did not score for the team result

Junior men's race (8 km)

Note: Athletes in parentheses did not score for the team result

Senior women's race (8 km)

Note: Athletes in parentheses did not score for the team result

Women's short race (4 km)

Note: Athletes in parentheses did not score for the team result

Junior women's race (6 km)

Note: Athletes in parentheses did not score for the team result

Medal table (unofficial)

Note: Totals include both individual and team medals, with medals in the team competition counting as one medal.

Participation
According to an unofficial count, 673 athletes from 72 countries participated.  This is in agreement with the official numbers as published.  The announced athletes from  did not show.

 (12)
 (2)
 (16)
 (2)
 (1)
 (6)
 (36)
 (4)
 (5)
 (5)
 (4)
 (33)
 (1)
 (2)
 (8)
 (1)
 (2)
 (2)
 (4)
 (4)
 (1)
 (19)
 (30)
 (32)
 (1)
 (2)
 (1)
 (1)
 (3)
 (17)
 (11)
 (23)
 (2)
 (36)
 (3)
 (2)
 (1)
 (5)
 (7)
 (34)
 (4)
 (6)
 (9)
 (4)
 (1)
 (4)
 (23)
 (13)
 (6)
 (2)
 (15)
 (10)
 (3)
 (2)
 (2)
 (12)
 (35)
 (13)
 (3)
 (13)
 (7)
 (3)
 (6)
 (6)
 (4)
 (30)
 (36)
 (5)
 (6)
 (2)
 (4)
 (3)

See also
 2004 IAAF World Cross Country Championships – Senior men's race
 2004 IAAF World Cross Country Championships – Men's short race
 2004 IAAF World Cross Country Championships – Junior men's race
 2004 IAAF World Cross Country Championships – Senior women's race
 2004 IAAF World Cross Country Championships – Women's short race
 2004 IAAF World Cross Country Championships – Junior women's race
 2004 in athletics (track and field)

References

External links
Official site

 
2004
Cross Country Championships
Cross Country
C
Cross country running in Belgium
Sports competitions in Brussels
2000s in Brussels
March 2004 sports events in Europe